The 1920 Washington & Jefferson Presidents football team was an American football team that represented Washington & Jefferson College as an independent during the 1920 college football season. Led by sixth-year head coach David C. Morrow, the team compiled a record of 6–3–1.

Schedule

References

Washington and Jefferson
Washington & Jefferson Presidents football seasons
Washington and Jefferson Presidents football